Foreign relations between Argentina and Paraguay, have existed for more than two centuries. Diplomatic relations between those two neighbors were established in 1811 with the signing of an agreement on Friendship, Assistance and Trade.   Both countries were at war between 1864 and 1870 (War of the Triple Alliance), but have not fought one another other since.

Argentina has an embassy in Asunción and three consulates-general (in Asunción, Ciudad del Este and Encarnación). Paraguay has an embassy in Buenos Aires and seven consulates (in Clorinda, Corrientes, Formosa, Posadas, Resistencia, Rosario and Puerto Iguazú). Both countries are full members of Mercosur, Union of South American Nations, Organization of American States, Organization of Ibero-American States, Rio Group, Group of 77, Latin American Economic System and Latin American Integration Association.

Both States share the Argentina–Paraguay border.

See also 
 Foreign relations of Argentina
 Foreign relations of Paraguay
 Paraguayan War
 Paraguayan immigration to Argentina

References

External links 
 List of Treaties ruling relations Argentina and Paraguay until 1976 (Argentine Foreign Ministry, in Spanish)
  List of Treaties ruling relations Argentina and Paraguay from 1977 until present (Argentine Foreign Ministry, in Spanish)
 Argentine embassy in Asuncion (in Spanish only)
  Paraguayan Ministry of Foreign Relations about relations with Argentina

 
Paraguay 
Bilateral relations of Paraguay